Le Celtico is a football rivalry contested between French clubs Guingamp and Rennes. The name of the derby derives from the fact that Guingamp and Rennes are situated in Brittany, a land emotionally attached to the Celtic culture.

History 
The rivalry began in the mid-90s when Guingamp first joined the top division of French football. Guingamp players were welcomed by a banner saying Bienvenue en ville (Welcome in the city) in the Stade de la Route de Lorient. Even if being judged as arrogant teasing from Rennes fans, Guingamp fans later replied with a Bienvenue chez les paysans (Welcome to farmers land) banner in the Stade de Roudourou.

On 9 May 2009, Guingamp, in Ligue 2 at this time, and Rennes, were competing for the Coupe de France title at the Stade de France. Despite the level difference, Guingamp won the cup thanks to Eduardo dos Santos, who scored two goals.

Five years later, on 3 May 2014, the two rivals came back to Stade de France for another Coupe de France final. Guingamp won again, this time with goals from Jonathan Martins Pereira and Mustapha Yatabaré, the latter of whom won his second Coupe de France.

References

External links
  Guingamp Official Site
  Rennes Official Site

French football derbies
En Avant Guingamp
Stade Rennais F.C.
Football in Brittany
1977 establishments in France
Recurring sporting events established in 1977
Nicknamed sporting events